Equal Justice Works is a Washington, D.C.-based nonprofit organization that focuses on careers in public service for lawyers. Equal Justice Works' stated mission is "to create a just society by mobilizing the next generation of lawyers committed to equal justice."

Programs 
Founded in 1986 as the National Association for Public Interest Law (NAPIL), the organization works with law schools, law firms, corporate legal departments and nonprofit organizations to provide  the training and skills that enable attorneys to provide legal assistance to the poor and other vulnerable populations.

Research has shown that early public interest experience for law students and new lawyers leads to a lifelong commitment to justice, but that debt keeps many law graduates from taking public interest jobs. Equal Justice Works has contributed to the research and advocacy of loan repayment assistance programs and the College Cost Reduction And Access Act of 2007.

One hundred ninety-five law schools (including 189 of the country's 196 American Bar Association-accredited law schools) are members of Equal Justice Works and participate in programs to develop public interest training and opportunities. The organization publishes The E-Guide to Public Service at America's Law Schools, an online resource of public service opportunities, curricula, and financial-aid programs. Equal Justice Works also hosts an annual Conference and Career Fair for employers, job seekers and law school professionals.

Through "Summer Corps"—a partnership between Equal Justice Works and AmeriCorps—350 law students serve at nonprofit legal aid organizations every summer.

"Equal Justice Works Fellowships" is the largest postgraduate legal fellowship program in the United States.  The projects proposed by the Fellows are varied and tend to reflect unresolved social and legal issues including immigration, health care and civil liberties.

Leadership 
Equal Justice Works is governed by a board of directors made up of law firm partners, corporate counsel, legal educators, and executives from legal services agencies. The 35-member staff is led by executive director, David Stern, deputy chief executive officer, Susan Gurley, and a management team of four directors at its Washington headquarters.

References

External links 

Equal Justice Works Fellowships
Equal Justice Works AmeriCorps
Summer Corps

Legal organizations based in the United States
Non-profit organizations based in Washington, D.C.
Organizations established in 1986
Legal advocacy organizations in the United States
1986 establishments in Washington, D.C.
Service year programs in the United States